The Profense PF 50 is a 12.7 mm electrically driven (non gas-operated) chain gun produced by Profense LLC, with a maximum rate of fire of 650 rpm. This  weapon is very similar to the M2HB machine gun, however it differs in operation system. It works with an electric motor as on the Bushmaster gun produced by ATK. The Profense PF 50 features a digital, programmable, variable rate Gun Control Unit (GCU). It can also be configured to single shot sniper mode, with optical sight mount. It can be installed on helicopter, naval vessels, wheeled vehicles, unmanned vehicles, aircraft, and remotely operated weapon stations.

See also 

 L94A1 chain gun, British 7.62 mm chain gun
 M242 Bushmaster, US 25 mm chain gun

References

External links 

 Profense website
 PF 50 brochure

Autocannon
Vehicle weapons
Machine guns
12.7 mm firearms
12.7 mm machine guns
Heavy machine guns